Jeff Knight (born 1968) is an American politician serving as a member of the Missouri House of Representatives from the 129th district. He assumed office in February 2018.

Early life and education 
Knight was born and raised in Lebanon, Missouri. He attended the University of Missouri and earned a Bachelor of Science degree in science education from Southwest Missouri State University.

Career 
After graduating from college, Knight worked as a teacher and coach in the Ozark School District, Nixa Public Schools, Lebanon School District, and Camdenton School District for a combined 25 years. He has since worked as an auctioneer. Knight was elected to the Missouri House of Representatives in a February 2018 special election.

References 

Living people
1968 births
People from Lebanon, Missouri
Educators from Missouri
Republican Party members of the Missouri House of Representatives
Missouri State University alumni
University of Missouri alumni